Ngiriambu is a settlement in Kenya's Central Province. Its currency is the shilling.
The sunrise is at 06:10 and sunset is at 18:19.

References 

Populated places in Central Province (Kenya)